Bonnie Christensen (January 23, 1951 – January 12, 2015) was an American author and illustrator best known for writing biographies and other illustrated non-fiction books for children and young adults.

Death
Christensen died of ovarian cancer on January 12, 2015, aged 63.

Bibliography

As author and illustrator
Elvis: The Story of the Rock and Roll King, Henry Holt, 2015
I, Galileo, Alfred A. Knopf, NY, 2012
Plant a Little Seed, Roaring Brook Press, NY, 2012
Fabulous, A Portrait of Andy Warhol, Henry Holt, 2011
Django, World's Greatest Jazz Guitarist, Roaring Brook Press, NY, 2009
The Daring Nellie Bly, Alfred A. Knopf, NY, 2003
In My Grandmother's House, HarperCollins, NY, 2003
Woody Guthrie, Poet of the People, Alfred A. Knopf, NY, 2001
Rebus Riot!, Dial/Penguin, NY, 1997
An Edible Alphabet, Dial/Penguin, NY, 1994

As illustrator
The Princess of Borscht by Leda Schubert. Roaring Brook Press, NY, 2011
Ida B. Wells by Walter Dean Myers. HarperCollins, NY, 2008
Magic in the Margins by W. Nikola-Lisa. Houghton Mifflin, Boston, 2007
Pompeii, Lost and Found by Mary Pope Osborne. Alfred A. Knopf, NY, 2006
I, Dred Scott by Sheila P. Moses. Simon & Schuster, NY, 2005
Moon Over Tennessee by Craig Crist Evan. Houghton Mifflin, Boston, 1999
The Grapes of Wrath by John Steinbeck. Folio Society, London, England, England, 1998
Breaking into Print by Stephen Krensky. Little, Brown & Co., Boston, 1996
Putting the World to Sleep by Shelley Moore Thomas. Houghton Mifflin, Boston, 1995
Green Mountain Ghosts, Ghouls, and Unsolved Mysteries by Joe Citro. Houghton Mifflin, Boston, 1994

Awards
Christensen received a number of book awards including an American Library Association Schneider Family Book Award (for Django, World's Greatest Jazz Guitarist in 2010), a Kirkus "Best Children's Book of 2006" designation (for her illustrations in Pompeii, Lost and Found in 2006), an Oppenheim Toy Portfolio Gold Award (for The Daring Nellie Bly in 2004), and a Horn Book-Boston Globe Honor Award, a Parent's Choice Gold Award, a designation of "Best Book Of the Year" by Publishers Weekly, a "Notable Books" designation by the New York Times Book Review, and a New York Book Show Award (for Woody Guthrie, Poet of the People in 2001).

References

External links

1951 births
2015 deaths
American women writers
American children's book illustrators
Deaths from ovarian cancer
Place of birth missing
Place of death missing
21st-century American women